Andreevca (Andriyivka, Andreyevka) is a commune in Transnistria, Moldova. It is composed of three villages: Andreevca, Pîcalova (Пикалово, Пыкалово) and Șmalena (Шмалена). It has since 1990 been administered as a part of the breakaway Pridnestrovian Moldavian Republic (PMR).

References

Communes of Transnistria
Rîbnița District